The Building at 126 South Riverview Street is a historic commercial building located in Bellevue, Iowa, United States.  It is one of over 217 limestone structures in Jackson County from the mid-19th century, of which 20 are commercial buildings.  The two-floor structure was built around 1855 to house a retail establishment, but its original use has not been determined.  The stone blocks that were used in its construction vary somewhat in shape and size, and they were laid in courses.  The rectangular plan structure features three narrow bays, a recessed entrance in the right bay, dressed stone lintels, and a stone storefront.  The window openings have been altered.  The building was listed on the National Register of Historic Places in 1991.

References

Commercial buildings completed in 1855
Vernacular architecture in Iowa
Commercial buildings on the National Register of Historic Places in Iowa
National Register of Historic Places in Jackson County, Iowa
Buildings and structures in Jackson County, Iowa
Bellevue